Fanny Paola Godoy Duarte (born 21 January 1998) is a Paraguayan footballer who plays as a midfielder for Spanish Primera Federación club CD Juan Grande and the Paraguay women's national team.

References

External links
Fanny Godoy at BDFútbol

1998 births
Living people
People from San Pedro Department, Paraguay
Paraguayan women's footballers
Women's association football midfielders
Deportivo Capiatá players
Club Sol de América footballers
Segunda Federación (women) players
Paraguay women's international footballers
Pan American Games competitors for Paraguay
Footballers at the 2019 Pan American Games
Paraguayan expatriate women's footballers
Paraguayan expatriate sportspeople in Spain
Expatriate women's footballers in Spain
20th-century Paraguayan women
21st-century Paraguayan women
Primera Federación (women) players